Szymon Koszyk (3 July 1891, Opole – 11 August 1972, Opole) was a Polish writer, national and social activist. He finished Teachers' Seminary in Prószków. He collaborated with Gazeta Opolska and Der Weisse Adler. He was conscripted to the German army in 1914, he fought in the Battle of Verdun and was severely wounded. In 1918 he deserted from the German Army and hid in Tarnów. There he formed a battalion of Polish soldiers and with its help he captured local Austrian garrison. In 1919 he returned to Opole and was sent by the local Poles to the Paris peace conference to represent Polish interests in Silesia. On 3 May 1920 he organised a march in Opole to commemorate the anniversary of adoption of the first Polish and second worldwide Constitution (the Constitution of 3 May 1791). The march was disrupted by local German militias who attacked Polish demonstrants.

From August 1920 to February 1921 he was the local commander of the Polish Military Organisation. In the III Silesian Uprising he commanded first Opole battalion. In 1923 he was arrested in Frankfurt am Main accused of espionage. After 3 years he was released thanks to intervention of the Nuncio. He returned to Upper Silesia and began working in Katowice in Voivodship office. He wrote for the local newspapers including: Tygodnik Illustrowany, Zwrot and Polonia. In 1938 he was awarded by the Polish Literature Academy with a golden Laurus.

During World War II he hid himself in Kresy and later in Kraków. After the war he was the mayor of Głuchołazy. After that, in 1947, he returned to Opole and again started to work in the press. He was one of the founders of the Opole city archives. He was a member of Związek Literatów Polskich, Silesian Institute, ZBoWiD and PTTK. Since 1957 retired. He died in 1972 in his hometown. One of the streets in Opole bears his name.

Notes 

People from Opole
Polish male writers
1891 births
1972 deaths
Polish people of World War I